Never Been Better Tour was the concert tour of British recording artist Olly Murs. The tour supports his fourth studio album Never Been Better (2014) and was announced in November 2014. Originally, only a leg consisting of 14 shows in UK was planned, but due to high demand, the run was expanded with more dates, also in the rest of Europe.

Set list
This set list is representative of the two shows in Sheffield on 31 March 2015 and 1 April 2015. It is not representative of all concerts for the duration of the tour.

"Did You Miss Me"
"Right Place Right Time"
"Why Do I Love You"
"Hey You Beautiful"
"Hand on Heart"
"Never Been Better"
"Seasons"
Medley: "Thinking of Me" / "Busy" / "Please Don't Let Me Go"
"Oh My Goodness"
"Hope You Got What You Came For"
"Heart Skips a Beat"
"Up" (with Ella Eyre)
"Dance with Me Tonight"
"Let Me In"
"Dear Darlin'"
"Uptown Funk" (Mark Ronson cover)
"Beautiful To Me"
"Troublemaker"
Encore:
"Nothing Without You"
"Wrapped Up"

Shows

Notes

References

2015 concert tours